Vance Matthew Buck (February 5, 1961 – July 6, 1993) was an American entrepreneur, best known for his long-term relationship with Elton John.

Biography 
Vance Buck was born on February 5, 1961, in Richmond, Virginia. In 1975, he moved to Manhattan, where he became immersed in the burgeoning punk rock scene. A talented entrepreneur, he soon became a luminary in New York City's underground nightlife. Buck was introduced to Elton John in 1978 by Andy Warhol, after which they became lovers and lifelong friends.

By the mid 1980s Buck became disenchanted with life on the road. In 1985, he moved to Milan, Italy, where he embarked upon a career in fashion. Shortly after moving to Milan, he lived and worked with Egon Von Furstenburg. After moving back to the United States in 1986 and testing positive for HIV, he quietly lobbied for AIDS awareness and prevention. It was Buck who brought Ryan White to the attention of Elton John.

Buck can be seen on the cover of Jump Up!, John's record of 1982. The song "Blue Eyes", from the same record, was written for him.

Buck died of complications of AIDS on July 6, 1992. Earlier that year, Elton John dedicated The One to him, which was emblazoned on the back of the record, with original artwork by Gianni Versace.

References

Businesspeople from Richmond, Virginia
1961 births
1992 deaths
AIDS-related deaths in Virginia
American expatriates in Italy
American LGBT businesspeople
20th-century American businesspeople
20th-century American LGBT people